Viscount Philippe de Tarrazi ( / ALA-LC: Fîlîb dî Tarrâzî; 28 April 1865 – 7 August 1956), was a polymath, philanthropist, founder of the National Library of Lebanon and a founding member of the Arab Academy of Damascus.

Life 
Philippe was born in Beirut to a renowned Syriac Catholic merchant family which had recently emigrated from Aleppo. His father was given the honorary title viscount by Pope Leo XIII, which he later held. He studied at the patriarchal school and later the Jesuit College. Philippe showed interest in the Syriac, Arabic and French literatures, and authored at least 57 books on these, of which only 25 were published.

De Tarrazi helped victims of the First World War. He was active in Lebanese Phoenicianist cultural circles and was also close to the Assyrian nationalist Naum Faiq.

De Tarrazi was an avid collector of books and publications. His library included an extensive collection of publication from the Near East.

Legacy
The Lebanese National Library was established in 1921, with a donation from Viscount de Tarrazi of twenty thousand books, many rare manuscripts, and the first issues of newspapers from the Near East.  De Tarazi's instructions were that his donation should form "the core of what should become the Great Library of Beyrouth."  It was placed under the supervision of the Ministry of National Education in 1922.  It moved to the Lebanese Parliament building in 1937.

References

1865 births
1956 deaths
Writers from Beirut
Syriac writers
Syriac Catholics
Lebanese nationalists
Lebanese people of Assyrian descent
Phoenicianists